Jorge Zaparaín Sanz (born 26 April 1984 in Zaragoza, Aragon) is a Spanish former footballer who played as a goalkeeper.

Honours
Spain U16
UEFA European Under-16 Championship: 2001

External links

1984 births
Living people
Footballers from Zaragoza
Spanish footballers
Association football goalkeepers
La Liga players
Segunda División players
Segunda División B players
Tercera División players
Real Zaragoza B players
Real Zaragoza players
CD Tudelano footballers
CD La Muela players
SD Huesca footballers
Spain youth international footballers